The Attilids were a leading dynasty of the Huns, a nomadic pastoralist people who confronted the Roman Empire during the decline of the Western Roman Empire, as well as the Eastern Roman Empire.  They also often fought in alliance with both of these empires against the invading Germanic people.

Origin 

The Attilids descended from Attila, the last sole ruler of the Hunnic Empire. Attila was of noble origin, the son of Mundzuk. His father was a brother of co-rulers of the Hunnic Empire Rugila and Octar, but never became king himself. He begat two sons by an unknown consort. His sons were Bleda and Attila, who succeeded their uncle Rugila as regents of the Empire. Rugila had become sole ruler after the death of his brother Octar in 430.

History
Attila and Bleda made a series of successful campaigns in the Balkans and Greece, capturing the major Roman cities up to arriving to Constantinople, where they destroyed the Roman forces around the city before forcing the Romans to pay an increased tribute of gold, along with other priviliges. Thereafter, Bleda died, allegedly killed by his brother Attila, possibly after provocation, Bleda having himself tried to kill Attila.

As sole ruler, Attila named his son Ellac King of the Nations of Pontic Scythia and bestowed on him the title of King of the Akatziri. Attila also showed a particular fondness for his younger son, Ernak, about whom his shamans/prophets had predicted an important role in the continuation of his line. Attila died before naming a heir, and his sons fought among themselves for the empire, tearing it apart. It is not known whether Ellac, the eldest son, became himself the sole ruler after the death of his father. He nevertheless died just a year later, at the Battle of Nedao. Dengizich, another prominent son of Attila, died 15 years later, in 469, after a failed invasion of the Eastern Roman Empire. Attila's young son, Ernak, is thought to have survived and to have been given land in the region of Dobruja.

Legacy 
Attila had many wives, and numerous children, allegedly "amounting to a people".

The Nominalia of the Bulgarian khans claimed the second ruler of the Dulo was Irnik, who is often identified with Ernak, a son of Attila. According to Bulgarian historian Vasil Zlatarski, if Irnik was indeed Ernak, then both Ernak and his father Attila belonged to the Dulo clan.

Medieval Hungarian chroniclers, Anonymus (notary of Béla III), Simon of Kéza, and Mark of Kalt, claimed Attilid ancestry for the Árpád dynasty and the Aba clan. Specifically:
Two Árpád dynasty's patriarchs, Árpád and his father Álmos, supposedly descended from a certain Ügyek:
Anonymus claimed that Álmos was the son of Ügyek, a descendant of Attila; however, Anonymus did not specify which of Attila's sons Ügyek descended from.
Simon of Kéza claimed that Álmos was the son of Előd, who in turn was the son of Ügyek, from the clan Turul, a mythological bird of prey that also allegedly had appeared on Attila (Ethele)'s coat of arms.
 Mark of Kalt claimed that Álmos was the son of Előd, son of Ügyek, son of Ed, son of the legendary Prince Csaba, son of Attila, etc.

The Aba clan supposedly descended from the legendary Prince Csaba, son of Attila.

According to historian Hyun Jin Kim, the Kutrigurs, Utigurs, Onogurs and Akatziris were all ruled by branches of the Attilid dynasty.

In popular culture
 The fantasy character Count Dracula is a direct descendant of Attila, as specified in the original novel Dracula by Bram Stoker.

Attilid Rulers 
Attila, king of the Huns, 434–453
Ellac, king of Pontic Scythia, king of the Akatziri, 448–454
Dengizich, king of the Huns, until 469
Ernak, king of the Huns, until 469 and beyond
Kubrat, ruler of the Onogur–Bulgars, c. 632–c. 650
Batbayan, ruler of Khazarian Bulgars, c. 665–c. 668
Asparuh, ruler of the Bulgars, 681–701
Tervel, Khan of Bulgaria, 700–721
Sevar, Khan of Bulgaria, 738–753
Álmos, Grand Prince of the Hungarians, c. 850–c. 895
Árpád, Grand Prince of the Hungarians, c. 895–c. 907

Others
Other members of the dynasty include:
Kreka (by marriage)
Ildico (by marriage)
Eskam's daughter (by marriage)
Anonyma, wife of Aruth the Herul
Atakam (unconfirmed)
Chorasminian woman (legendary)
Emnetzur (unconfirmed)
Gordas (unconfirmed)
Mamas (unconfirmed)
Mauricius
Mundus
Theudimundus
Ultzindur (unconfirmed)
Unnamed daughter of Honorius (by marriage; legendary)

Genealogy

See also 
 List of rulers of the Huns
 List of Huns

Notes

References 

Huns
European dynasties